The Michael Martin Murphey discography consists of 33 albums and 46 singles. Having first charted with "Geronimo's Cadillac" in 1972, he did not chart again until "Wildfire" three years later. Initially a pop singer, Murphey shifted to country music in 1982 with "What's Forever For", a number 1 country hit. On his earlier works he was billed as simply "Michael Murphey", adding his middle name with the 1982 album Michael Martin Murphey.

Studio albums

1970s

1980s

1990s

2000s

2010s

2020s 

|}

Compilation albums

Singles

1970s

1980s

1990s

Music videos

References

Discographies of American artists
Country music discographies